The 2021 Scottish Liberal Democrats leadership election was triggered on 12 July 2021 after incumbent leader Willie Rennie announced his intention to step down as leader of the Scottish Liberal Democrats following the 2021 Scottish Parliament election.

On 27 July, Edinburgh Western MSP Alex Cole-Hamilton announced his intention to run for leader. He stated that he wanted to offer an "alternative kind of thinking" to what he described as "the Scottish nationalism of the SNP and the British nationalism of Boris Johnson's Brexiteers".

Throughout the election, Deputy Leader Alistair Carmichael (MP for Orkney and Shetland) served as Interim Leader.

Candidates 
Only sitting MSPs may seek nominations to become leader, with Cole-Hamilton the only one to announce their candidacy. The party's executive stated its aim to conduct the election before Holyrood returns from its summer recess.

Nominations for the election opened on 20 July and closed on 20 August.

As only Cole-Hamilton announced his candidacy for the leadership, he was declared the leader of the party on 20 August.

References

See also 

2021 Scottish Labour leadership election

2021 in Scotland
2020s elections in Scotland
2021 elections in the United Kingdom
2021
Scottish Liberal Democrats leadership election